Tveite may refer to:

 Håvard Tveite (b. 1962), Norwegian orienteering competitor
 Marit Tveite Bystøl (b. 1981), Norwegian ski mountaineer